The Freewind Bumble B is a French autogyro that was designed  and produced by Freewind Aviation of Vimory, introduced in about 2013. Now out of production, when it was available the aircraft was supplied complete and ready-to-fly.

Freewind Aviation seems to have been founded about 2013 and gone out of business in 2014. It is not clear how many aircraft were produced, although at least one example flew.

Design and development
The Bumble B features a single main rotor, a two-seats-in tandem open cockpit with composite fairing and a windshield, tricycle landing gear and a modified four-cylinder, liquid and air-cooled, four stroke, turbocharged  Rotax 912 engine in pusher configuration.

Reviewer Werner Pfaendler described the design as, "a low cost but good quality gyrocopter with excellent flight characteristics".

Specifications (Bumble B 912 Supercharged)

See also
List of rotorcraft

References

External links
Official website archives

Bumble B
2010s French sport aircraft
Single-engined pusher autogyros